The Bina Footprint (or Dauda Woyaba) is a small tourist attraction in Lapai, Nigeria showing a footprint on top of a rock.

Local history 
According to the local legend, it is a footprint of a man called Dabo in a small village 3 km from Muye area, Niger State.

In a report stated that Dabo step on top of the rock with his left foot on his way from Bina Village to Gulu area to performed ablution for prayers and later he migrated to Kano, but before he left he built a Mosque at the place and lives in there for some times before leaving to another geographical location and till now the print still exist on the top of the rock.

Notes 

Tourist attractions in Nigeria